The Pomerania Tour (2003-2008: Pomorski Klasyk) is a cycling race held annually in the Pomeranian Voivodeship, Poland. It was first held in 2003 as the Pomorski Klasyk and since 2005 has been part of the UCI Europe Tour. In 2009, the name was changed to Pomerania Tour and the event was extended to a stage race. In 2010, it was held as a single-day race again.

Past winners

External links

UCI Europe Tour races
Cycle races in Poland
Recurring sporting events established in 2003
Sport in Pomeranian Voivodeship
2003 establishments in Poland